= Nadie se meta =

Single by Ala Jaza
- Released: October 25, 2018
- Genre: Merengue de Calle
- Length: 4:19
- Label: Carbon Fiber Music

Ala Jaza singles chronology
"Te soñe" (2018)	"Nadie se meta" (2018)

Nadie se meta is a song by the Dominican songwriter and urban artist Ala Jaza. It was released on October 25, 2018 by the label Carbon Fiber Music. The single was a commercial success across some Latin American countries including his natal Dominican Republic.

== Music video ==
A music video was released on October 25, 2018 to support the single. It was directed by Dominican filmmaker Rodrigo Films a was shot at Santo Domingo, Dominican Republic. The music video has over 34 million views as of July 2019.

== Charts ==
Chart (2019)	Peak position
Colombia (National-Report)	84
Dominican Republic (Monitor Latino)	17
US Tropical Songs (Billboard)	4
